Save the Family is a 2015 South Korean daily drama starring Jae Hee, Kang Byul and Jung Hye-in. It aired on KBS1 on Mondays to Fridays at 20:25 for 123 episodes from May 11 to October 30, 2015.

Plot
A family drama that looks at the meaning of 'family' and the duties of parents and children through a three-generation families.

Jung Woo-jin (Jae Hee), an ambitious doctor, is not successful in his career and in his love life due to his family background. After he is passed over for a promotion as a specialist, he works in a small hospital emergency room near his home. He is in love with Go Ye-won (Jung Hye-in) but her family strongly oppose their relationship.

One day, Woo-jin meets Lee Hae-soo (Kang Byul) after getting drunk which causes misunderstandings between them. However, Woo-jin and Hae-soo encounter each other often as they live in the same neighbourhood and Hae-soo works in the same hospital as a kitchen assistant to a chef in the hospital cafeteria. Gradually, they develop feelings for each other. But their relationship is opposed by Woo-jin's family who has high expectations for his future.

Having failed in love and no longer believes in true love, Woo-jin resigns to his mother Bok Soo-ja's (Lee Hwi-hyang) wish and decides to marry Ye-won. Will Soo-ja's wish come true?

Cast

Main characters
Jae Hee as Jung Woo-jin
Kang Byul as Lee Hae-soo
Jung Hye-in as Go Ye-won

Supporting characters
Choi Il-hwa as Jung Man-jae 
Lee Hwi-hyang as Bok Soo-ja
Byun Hee-bong as Jung Soo-bong
Ban Hyo-jung as Cha Ong-shim
Narsha as Jung Hee-jin
Park Chul-ho as Jung Ho-jae
Im Sung-min as Na Ae-ran
Shin Seung-hwan as Jung Tae-jin
Im Chae-won as Choi Yoon-jung
Kim Dong-yoon as Choi Yoon-chan
Lee Yul-eum as Oh Se-mi
Jung Da-bin as Son Da-hye
Jo Young-min as Ji-won
Ham Sung-min as Lee Jung-su	
Romina as Mina
Aleyna as Dongbaek

Awards and nominations

References

External links 
  
 
 

Korean Broadcasting System television dramas
2015 South Korean television series debuts
Korean-language television shows
2015 South Korean television series endings